The Palestine League, also known as The Eretz Israel League, was an association football league during the British Mandate of  Palestine (now Israel), which was contested from 1928 to 1948. It was organised by the Eretz Israel Football Association, and is therefore regarded as the original incarnation of the modern Israeli top flight league, which has existed since 1948.

Organisation and history
Organised by the Eretz Israel Football Association, later to become the Israel Football Association, it is regarded as a predecessor of the modern Israeli Premier League, as well as a former part of the Israeli football league system. Because of violent conflicts involving the Yishuv, its scheduling was inconsistent and in some seasons no national championship was held. The league was suspended for two seasons after 1947 amidst the termination of the British Mandate over the country in May 1948, the independence of the State of Israel at the same time, and the subsequent war between Israel and several surrounding countries. The Palestine League was formally superseded in 1949 by the new Israeli League, Liga Alef.

The Palestine League was first won by a team representing the British Police force, who finished the season unbeaten. They also won the People's Cup that season, in doing so winning the double. Except for Jerusalem-based British Police's initial victory, only clubs from Tel Aviv won the title during the Mandate period; Hapoel and Maccabi Tel Aviv won five and four championships respectively.

Seasons
Key

Full league standings and top scorer details not known at this time.

See also
Football in Israel
Ligat Ha'al
Liga Alef

Notes

References

 
Defunct football leagues in Israel
Football competitions in Mandatory Palestine
Defunct top level football leagues in Europe